Piedmont is a city in Meade County, South Dakota, United States.  According to the 2020 census, its population was 971. Piedmont lies along Interstate 90 between Rapid City and Sturgis. Piedmont has been assigned the ZIP Code of 57769.

History
Piedmont takes its name from a French word meaning "the foot of the mountain", because it lies on the eastern slope of the Black Hills. Piedmont was founded in 1890 and remained unincorporated for nearly 117 years. It officially became a city August 16, 2007, and elected its first town board in November 2007. The area was first inhabited in the mid-1870s.

Geography
Piedmont is located in part of an area referred to as the Red Valley, or Race Track, a rock layer in the Spearfish Formation, which forms a valley circling the Black Hills. It is mostly red shale with beds of gypsum. Piedmont lies west of Interstate 90, north of Summerset, east of the Black Hills National Forest, and south of Elk Creek.

Climate

Demographics

2010 census
As of the census of 2010, 222 people, 101 households, and 64 families were residing in the city. The racial makeup of the city was 91.4% White, 0.5% African American, 6.8% Native American, 0.5% from other races, and 0.9% from two or more races. Hispanics or Latinos of any race were 1.8% of the population.

Of the 101 households, 23.8% had children under 18 living with them, 53.5% were married couples, 5.9% had a female householder with no husband present, 4.0% had a male householder with no wife present, and 36.6% were not families. About 30.7% of all households were made up of individuals, and 12.9% had someone living alone who was 65 or older. The average household size was 2.20, and the average family size was 2.66.

The median age in the city was 43.8 years; 18.9% of residents were under the age of 18; 9.2% were between 18 and 24; 23.5% were from 25 to 44; 37% were from 45 to 64; and 11.7% were 65 or older. The gender makeup of the city was 52.3% male and 47.7% female.

Natural disasters
The Piedmont area has experienced several large forest fires in recent years, including the Little Elk in 2002, Ricco Fire in 2005, and Eastridge Fire in 2006. In August 2007 Piedmont experienced a significant storm, including softball-sized hail and heavy rain, which caused significant flooding and other damage to the city.

Economy
Many Piedmont area residents work in nearby Rapid City. Larger private employers include Mountain West Products, which processes bark from area sawmills into retail landscape products, High Plains Genetics, which provides genetic material to livestock producers, and  Jack's Campers. Piedmont has numerous small businesses in tourism, transportation, and construction.

References

Cities in Meade County, South Dakota
Rapid City, South Dakota metropolitan area
Cities in South Dakota